is a former Japanese football player.

Playing career
Saito was born in Nagoya on November 19, 1974. After graduating from Chuo University, he joined J1 League club Gamba Osaka in 1997. He became a regular player as center back from first season. However his opportunity to play decreased for injury from 1998. In 2000, he moved to across town to the Gamba Osaka rivals, Cerezo Osaka. Although he played as regular player, the club was relegated to J2 League from 2002. In May 2002, he moved to JEF United Ichihara (later JEF United Chiba). He played as center back for the club for a long time. The club won the champions 2005 and 2006 J.League Cup. His opportunity to play decreased and he also played as defensive midfielder not only center back from 2008. He retired end of 2009 season.

Club statistics

Honors
 JEF United Chiba
 J.League Cup : 2005, 2006

References

External links

1974 births
Living people
Chuo University alumni
Association football people from Aichi Prefecture
Japanese footballers
J1 League players
J2 League players
Gamba Osaka players
Cerezo Osaka players
JEF United Chiba players
Association football defenders